Jean-Marie François (born 12 May 1963) is a Venezuelan former swimmer who competed in the 1980 Summer Olympics and in the 1984 Summer Olympics.

References

1963 births
Living people
Venezuelan male freestyle swimmers
Olympic swimmers of Venezuela
Swimmers at the 1979 Pan American Games
Swimmers at the 1980 Summer Olympics
Swimmers at the 1983 Pan American Games
Swimmers at the 1984 Summer Olympics
Pan American Games bronze medalists for Venezuela
Pan American Games medalists in swimming
Central American and Caribbean Games gold medalists for Venezuela
Competitors at the 1982 Central American and Caribbean Games
Central American and Caribbean Games medalists in swimming
Medalists at the 1983 Pan American Games
20th-century Venezuelan people
21st-century Venezuelan people